Paul Joseph Barrowcliff (born 15 June 1969) is an English retired semi-professional footballer who played as midfielder. He had a long career in non-League football and played one season in the Football League for Brentford. He is currently the physiotherapist at Metropolitan Police.

Playing career

Beginnings in non-League football (1988–1997) 
Barrowcliff got into football through attending the Boys' Brigade and scouts as a youth. He began his senior career at Isthmian League Second Division South club Ruislip Manor in 1988 and moved up a level to sign for Premier Division club Hayes in February 1989. While at Hayes, Barrowcliff featured on loan for Isthmian League First Division club Chalfont St Peter in January 1990. He moved across the Isthmian League Premier Division to sign for Harrow Borough in March 1990. He departed early in the 1990–91 season to move Isthmian Premier Division club St Albans City and left to join divisional rivals Woking in February 1990.

Barrowcliff moved to Isthmian League Premier Division club Kingstonian in 1991 and played at Conference level for the first time when he signed for Wycombe Wanderers in 1992. Barrowcliff made just six appearances and left after the 1992–93 season to join Isthmian League Premier Division club Sutton United. Barrowcliff signed for Isthmian League Premier Division club Aylesbury United during the 1994–95 season and made 19 appearances before leaving at the end of the campaign.

Barrowcliff joined newly-promoted Conference club Stevenage Borough during the 1995 off-season. He was a vital part of the team which won the 1995–96 Conference title, making 50 appearances and scoring eight goals, but the club was not promoted to the Football League due to its Broadhall Way ground not meeting Football League requirements. Barrowcliff was named the club's 1995–96 Supporters' Player Of The Year award and also captained the team. He stayed with Stevenage for the 1996–97 season and left the club in August 1997.

Brentford 
On 1 August 1997, Barrowcliff moved up to the Football League when he transferred to Second Division club Brentford for a £60,000 fee. He started Brentford's first six games in all competitions and returned to former club Stevenage Borough on a one-month loan in October 1997. He made five appearances during his spell and following his return to Brentford, he made substitute cameos and occasional starts, before injury ended his season in December. Barrowcliff was transfer-listed in February 1998 and his contract was cancelled by mutual consent after Brentford's final-day relegation to the Third Division. He made 16 appearances during the 1997–98 season.

Return to non-League football (1998–2009) 
Following his release from Brentford, Barrowcliff joined Isthmian League Premier Division club Hendon during the 1998 off-season. He failed to make an appearance and moved across the division to sign for Chesham United later in the year.

Barrowcliff transferred to Isthmian League Premier Division club Slough Town in January 1999. During what remained of the 1998–99 season, Barrowcliff made 18 appearances and scored three goals. He made 31 appearances during the 1999–00 season and scored one goal. After a period out of the team during the early months of the 2000–01 season, Barrowcliff was a virtual ever-present from November 2000 onwards and finished the season with 32 appearances. His performances were a rare highlight of a season which saw Slough suffer relegation.

Playing at Isthmian League First Division level for the first time since 1990, Barrowcliff was again a virtual ever-present for Slough Town during the 2001–02 season and made 46 appearances, scoring two goals. Barrowcliff played 39 matches during the 2002–03 season before departing to join Isthmian League First Division South club Metropolitan Police in February 2003.

Barrowcliff returned to Slough Town (now playing in the Isthmian League First Division South) in September 2003 and had a successful 2003–04 season with the club. He made 27 appearances and helped Slough to a fourth-place finish, which saw the Rebels secure promotion back to the Isthmian League Premier Division. During his two spells at Slough Town, Barrowcliff made 193 appearances and scored six goals.

Barrowcliff returned to Metropolitan Police during the 2004 off-season. He made just 10 appearances during the 2004–05 season, but he captained the club during the 2005–06 season. Barrowcliff made 13 appearances during the 2006–07 season, but failed to make an appearance during the 2007–08 and 2008–09 seasons and retired in 2009. After his retirement, he became the club's physiotherapist. He represented the club's Veterans team in the 2012–13 Isthmian Veterans' Cup and played in the final, which was lost 2–1 to Northwood Vets.

Personal life 
Barrowcliff worked as a personal trainer and as of October 2012, was working for the Metropolitan Police.

Career statistics

Honours 
 Stevenage Borough
 Football Conference: 1995–96
 Herts Charity Cup: 1995–96

Slough Town

 Isthmian League First Division South: 2003–04

Individual

 Stevenage Borough Supporters' Player of the Year: 1996–97

References

External links

1969 births
Living people
Footballers from Hillingdon
English footballers
Association football defenders
English Football League players
National League (English football) players
Brentford F.C. players
Tokyngton Manor F.C. players
Hayes F.C. players
Chalfont St Peter A.F.C. players
Harrow Borough F.C. players
St Albans City F.C. players
Woking F.C. players
Kingstonian F.C. players
Wycombe Wanderers F.C. players
Sutton United F.C. players
Aylesbury United F.C. players
Stevenage F.C. players
Hendon F.C. players
Chesham United F.C. players
Slough Town F.C. players
Metropolitan Police F.C. players
Isthmian League players